Ahmed Juma ALNAQBI (born 25 jun 1999) is a Bahraini footballer who plays as a defender for Al-Muharraq and the Bahrain national team.

Career
Juma was included in Bahrain's squad for the 2019 AFC Asian Cup in the United Arab Emirates.

Career statistics

International

International goals

References

External links
 
 
 
 
 Ahmed Juma at WorldFootball.com

1992 births
Living people
Sportspeople from Manama
Bahraini footballers
Bahrain international footballers
Association football defenders
Al Hala SC players
Al-Muharraq SC players
Bahraini Premier League players
2019 AFC Asian Cup players